Jacob Saifiti (born 1 May 1996) is a Fiji international rugby league footballer who plays as a  forward for the Newcastle Knights in the NRL.

Background
Saifiti was born in Newcastle, New South Wales, Australia. He is of Fijian and Samoan descent and moved to the Central Coast at a young age. He is the identical twin brother of Knights teammate Daniel Saifiti.

Saifiti played his junior rugby league for the Terrigal Sharks and The Entrance Tigers, before joining the Newcastle Knights in 2015.

Playing career

2015
In 2015, Saifiti played for the Newcastle Knights' NYC team. On 2 May, he played for Fiji against Papua New Guinea, alongside his twin brother Daniel. On 27 September, he played in Newcastle's 2015 New South Wales Cup Grand Final win over the Wyong Roos. During the year, he re-signed with the Newcastle club on a two-year contract.

2016
In round 1 of the 2016 NRL season, Saifiti made his NRL debut for the Newcastle Knights against the Gold Coast Titans, playing alongside his brother Daniel, becoming the first twins in Australian rugby league's 108-year history to debut together. On 12 May, he and his brother extended their contracts with the Knights from the end of 2017 until the end of 2018.  He made a total of 18 appearances for Newcastle in his debut season as the club finished last on the table.

2017
Saifiti played 21 games for the Newcastle club in the 2017 season, before having his contract extended until the end of 2020.  Newcastle would finish bottom of the table for a third straight season.

2018
Saifiti was limited to only eight games for Newcastle in the 2018 NRL season as the club finished 11th on the table.

2019
Saifiti played 7 games for Newcastle in the 2019 NRL season as the club finished 11th on the table.

2020
Saifiti played 21 games for Newcastle in the 2020 NRL season. He played in Newcastle's first finals game since 2013 which was a 46-20 loss against South Sydney in the elimination final.

2021
He played 23 matches for Newcastle in the 2021 NRL season including the club's elimination finals loss against Parramatta.

2022
Saifiti was selected as a reserve player for New South Wales in the 2022 State of Origin series. He made his Origin debut against Queensland after the withdrawal of Jordan McLean in Game 3 of the series at Suncorp Stadium. Saifiti scored a first half try as New South Wales eventually lost the match 22-12.

Saifiti played 23 games for Newcastle in the 2022 NRL season as the club missed the finals finishing 14th on the table.

2023
In round 2 of the 2023 NRL season, Saifiti was sent off for a dangerous high tackle on Wests Tigers player Jake Simpkin. Newcastle would go on to win the match 14-12. Saifiti was later suspended for five matches over the incident.

Controversy
On 2 December 2018, Saifiti was found unconscious and with a broken leg after a fight with Dane Cordner, the brother of NSW captain and Sydney Roosters player Boyd Cordner.  Saifiti was later cleared of any wrongdoing but was fined $50,000 by Newcastle over the incident.

References

External links

Newcastle Knights profile
2017 RLWC profile

1996 births
Living people
Australian people of Fijian descent
Australian sportspeople of Samoan descent
Australian rugby league players
Fiji national rugby league team players
Newcastle Knights players
New South Wales Rugby League State of Origin players
Rugby league players from Newcastle, New South Wales
Rugby league props
Rugby league second-rows